Forest Hill was a provincial electoral district in Ontario, Canada. It was created prior to the 1963 provincial election and eliminated in 1975. Forest Hill riding was located in the former village of Forest Hill and the borough of York east of Dufferin Street.  It had a large Jewish community, representing about 30% of the population.

Two Members of Provincial Parliament represented the riding during its history. The first, Edward Arunah Dunlop, Jr., was a son of Edward Arunah Dunlop, a veteran provincial politician who had previously represented the riding of Renfrew North.  Former Toronto mayor Philip Givens represented the riding until it was abolished in 1975.

In the redistribution that took effect in the 1975 election, Forest Hill went to the riding of St. Andrew--St. Patrick and the borough of York sections went to the riding of Oakwood.

Members of Provincial Parliament

Electoral results

Forest Hill

York-Forest Hill

References

Former provincial electoral districts of Ontario
Provincial electoral districts of Toronto